Iosif Leonidovich Prut  (6 November 1900 – 16 July 1996) was a Russian playwright and the first Soviet screenwriter. Prut was awarded the title of Honoured Artist of the RSFSR (1983).

Biography
Iosif Prut was born on November 18, 1900, in the city of Taganrog, in the Don Host Oblast of the Russian Empire. In 1901 his immediate family were diagnosed with acute tuberculosis and they travelled to Leysin, Switzerland, for a treatment in a local clinic. His father soon died of complications and was buried in Gerbersdorf, Germany. Iosif stayed in Leysin for treatment until 1908.

After returning several times to Taganrog and studying for a while at a Rostov on Don gymnasium, he moved to Switzerland for permanent residence with his aunt Anne Helghi and entered the École Nouvelle, a private school in Chailly near Lausanne. Among his alumni and close friends were Edward "Donnie" Donegall (1915-1918), a well-known war journalist, Constantine "Costa" Gratsos, vice president of Onassis' Victory Carriers, and Frédéric Siordet, lawyer, author and vice president of the International Red Cross.

In 1918 he graduated from the École Nouvelle and enlisted to the École Polytechnique in Paris, but quit and volunteered to serve in the Russian expeditionary corps. Iosif Prut was decorated with a Transfiguration cross.

After returning to Russia, he participated in the Russian Civil War within the 1st Cavalry Army (Soviet Union) under command of Semyon Budyonny, was in command of a platoon within the 36th regiment of the 6th Cavalry Caucasus division.

Iosif Prut moved to Moscow in 1922.

For the first time Prut wrote for a Red Army gazette in 1919. Most playwrights were dedicated to the Soviet Army and were staged at the Red Army Theater.

Prut worked for the Mezhrabpom-Rus(Межрабпом-Русь) film studio in 1924–1928, and for Lenfilm in 1928–1932.

During the German-Soviet War, he served at a mobile tank-repairing factory, later headed the club of the 222nd Smolensk Red-Banner Rifle Division (222 Смоленская Краснознаменная стрелковая дивизия), participated in several reconnaissance raid in the enemy rear, earning the Soviet Medal for Combat Service.

Iosif Prut died in Brest on July 16, 1996.

Bibliography (plays)
 Маршал удалой: Пьеса. Л., 1932
 Князь Мстислав Удалой: Пьеса. М., 1933
 О.К.Б.: Этапы человеческой жизни. Л.; М., 1934
 Восточный батальон. М., 1935. В соавторстве с братьями Тур
 Я вас люблю: Лирические сцены. М., 1935
 Член Реввоенсовета. М., 1936
 Год девятнадцатый: Пьеса. М., 1937
 Две ночи: Пьеса. М., 1940
 Дорога на юг: Историческая хроника. М., 1940
 Молодая гвардия: Пьеса. М., 1940
 Секретарь райкома: Пьеса. М., 1943
 Судьба Реджинальда Дэвиса: Пьеса. М., 1947. В соавторстве с В.М.Кожевниковым
 Тихий океан: Пьеса. М.; Л., 1949
 Пьесы. М., 1951
 Конек-Горбунок: Пьеса по мотивам одноименной сказки. М., 1959
 Пьесы. М., 1963
 Останемся верны: Пьеса. М., 1970. В соавторстве с Г.Д.Красильниковым
 На новой улице: Пьеса. М., 1973
 Солдаты: Пьеса. М., 1975
 Разгром: Драматическая поэма. М., 1976. В соавторстве с Н.Захаровым
 Ну и ну! или довольно странная история, изложенная в 2-х действиях, 6 карт. М., 1977
 Золотой песок: Пьеса. М., 1979
 Пьесы. М., 1982
 Катрин: Музыкальная комедия по мотивам В.Сарду. М., 1984. В соавторстве с А.Дноховским.

Filmography

Screenwriter 
 1929 — Сто двадцать тысяч в год — with G. Chernyak
 1931 — Огонь («Костер с далекой реки»)
 1931 — Человек из тюрьмы («Человек за решеткой») (1931),
 1932 — Запах великой империи, with M. Gerasimov
 1932 — Для вас найдется работа, with Ilya Trauberg
 1937 — The Thirteen (Тринадцать), with Mikhail Romm
 1938 — Год девятнадцатый, with Ilya Trauberg
 1938 — Пограничная застава
 1939 — Эскадрилья No. 5
 1940 — My Love (Моя любовь)
 1942 — Секретарь райкома
 1942 — Сын бойца (новелла в киноальманахе «Боевой киносборник» No. 12)
 1943 — Одна семья (фильм на экраны не вышел) — with Lev Vaysenberg and M. Dzhal
 1948 — Мальчик с окраины, with V. Kozhevnik
 1950 — В мирные дни
 1954 — Богатырь» идет в Марто
 1955 — Случай с ефрейтором Кочетковым
 1960 — Девичья весна, with M. Dolgopolov and N. Nadezhdina
 1962 — Здравствуйте, дети!, with I. Donskoy
 1964 — Ждите нас на рассвете — with Emil Loteanu
 1965 — Последняя ночь в раю, with G. Malarchuk
 1966 — Сурайя (also known as «Жизнь прошла ночью»), with U. Nazarov
 1967 — Чернушка, with S. Makhmudbekov
 1969 — Взрыв после полуночи, with E. Karamyan
 1970 — «Совесть заела» 
 1973 — За час до рассвета

Honours and awards
 Honoured Artist of the RSFSR (1983)
 Order of Friendship of Peoples
 Order of the Badge of Honour
 Medal for Combat Service

External links and references

 И.Л. Прут, биография
 И.Л. Прут на сайте «Культура России»

1900 births
1996 deaths
Writers from Taganrog
People from Don Host Oblast
People of the Russian Civil War
Russian male dramatists and playwrights
Male screenwriters
Soviet military personnel of World War II
Soviet screenwriters
Soviet dramatists and playwrights
Soviet male writers
20th-century male writers
Honored Artists of the RSFSR
Recipients of the Order of Friendship of Peoples